Campsie Glen railway station served the village of Clachan of Campsie, East Dunbartonshire, Scotland from 1867 to 1951 on the Blane Valley Railway; the village was in Stirlingshire during the period of operation of the station.

History 
The station opened on 1 July 1867 by the North British Railway. At the east end was a siding. The station closed on 1 January 1917 but reopened on 1 February 1919, before closing permanently on 1 October 1951.

References

External links 

Disused railway stations in East Dunbartonshire
Railway stations in Great Britain opened in 1867
Railway stations in Great Britain closed in 1951
Former North British Railway stations
1867 establishments in Scotland
1951 disestablishments in Scotland